Assault on Precinct 13 is a 2005 action thriller film directed by Jean-François Richet and starring Ethan Hawke and Laurence Fishburne. The cast also includes John Leguizamo, Maria Bello, Ja Rule, Drea de Matteo, Brian Dennehy, and Gabriel Byrne. It is a remake of John Carpenter's 1976 film of the same name.

Plot

Following a failed sting operation in which two fellow undercover officers are killed months prior, Detroit Police Department Sergeant Jake Roenick begins to regularly abuse alcohol and painkillers while clinging to his unambitious assignment as a desk sergeant at Precinct 13, which is due to be decommissioned. On New Year's Eve, Roenick, officer Jasper O'Shea, and secretary Iris Ferry maintain a skeleton shift. Psychiatrist Alexandra Sabian arrives to evaluate Roenick's fitness for duty.

Crime boss Marion Bishop is arrested after killing an undercover policeman, and is set to be transferred to prison with three other criminals: Beck, Anna, and Smiley. When a snowstorm shuts down the roads, the prison transport is diverted to Precinct 13, where an unprepared Roenick places the prisoners in cells.

Masked gunmen cut off the precinct's communications and electricity, and attack the station, killing the deputies before demanding that Bishop be handed over. Roenick kills one of the attackers and finds he is an undercover cop working under Captain Marcus Duvall of Precinct 21. Bishop explains that Duvall and his team are corrupt and were formerly his business partners. They now plan to eliminate him to preserve their secret.

The precinct staff and criminals form an uneasy truce. Heavily outnumbered and outgunned, Roenick releases the prisoners and arms them to help defend the precinct. Their combined efforts repel several more attacks, eventually leading to a stalemate. Another officer, Capra, arrives and is shot at by the corrupt officers, but makes it inside, but Bishop suspects him of being sent by Duvall when he discovers an unlocked back entrance.

Beck and Smiley meanwhile secretly conspire to escape; simultaneously, the rest of the defenders plan for Anna and Sabian to escape in Capra's SUV. When Beck and Smiley sneak out, they are killed by Duvall's men, providing the distraction which allows Anna and Sabian to drive off but they are ambushed by Duvall’s right-hand man Kahane; who kills Anna, having been hiding in the back seat, whilst Duvall kills Sabian after she refuses to cooperate.

When the snowfall subsides, Duvall calls in a corrupt SWAT team who land on the roof of the precinct. The defenders flee through a utilities tunnel underneath the building. Emerging from the tunnel, they find themselves surrounded by Duvall's men. The traitor is revealed to be O'Shea and not Capra. As Duvall prepares to execute the others, Bishop secretly plants a flash bang grenade on O'Shea, mortally wounding him. In the confusion, Iris and Capra flee in Duvall's SUV. Kahane shoots out the tires, causing the vehicle to crash and knock Capra unconscious, but Iris manages to kill Kahane after a struggle.

Duvall chases Roenick and Bishop into a nearby forest where they ambush and kill the remaining forces, however Duvall shoots and wounds Bishop before being killed by Roenick, who is himself injured in the process. Following this, an injured Bishop takes Roenick's gun and flees, and Roenick promises to personally arrest him in the future. When Iris arrives with police and firemen, Roenick claims that only he and Duvall's gang are present, knowing that Bishop can't go too far but wanting to give him the illusion of liberty. As the authorities secure the area, Roenick and Iris leave the forest as the sun rises.

Cast

 Ethan Hawke as Sergeant Jake Roenick
 Laurence Fishburne as Marion Bishop
 John Leguizamo as Beck
 Maria Bello as Dr. Alex Sabian
 Jeffrey "Ja Rule" Atkins as Smiley 
 Drea de Matteo as Iris Ferry
 Matt Craven as Officer Kevin Capra
 Brian Dennehy as Officer Jasper O'Shea
 Gabriel Byrne as Captain Marcus Duvall
 Kim Coates as Deputy Rosen
 Dorian Harewood as Deputy Gil
 Currie Graham as Lieutenant Mike Kahane
 Fulvio Cecere as Officer Ray Portnell
 Titus Welliver as Milos
 Aisha Hinds as Anna

Production

Assault on Precinct 13 was mostly filmed on location in Detroit, as well as in Ontario, Canada (Toronto and Hamilton).

Reception

Box office
Assault on Precinct 13 grossed $35.3 million worldwide on a budget of $30 million.

Critical response
On Rotten Tomatoes, it has a 59% rating  based on reviews from 165 critics. The site's critical consensus being "This remake has been praised by some as an expertly made B-movie, and dismissed by others as formulaic". On Metacritic it has a score of 54 out of 100, based on reviews from 39 critics, indicating "mixed or average reviews".

See also 
 List of American films of 2005

References

External links
 
 
 
 

2005 films
2005 action thriller films
American action thriller films
Remakes of American films
English-language French films
French action thriller films
2000s English-language films
Fictional portrayals of the Detroit Police Department
Films directed by Jean-François Richet
Films scored by Graeme Revell
Films set in 2004
Films set in 2005
Films set in Detroit
Films shot in Detroit
Films shot in Hamilton, Ontario
Films shot in Toronto
Films with screenplays by James DeMonaco
Films set around New Year
Rogue (company) films
Siege films
2000s American films
2000s French films
Foreign films set in the United States